Une voix dans le désert ("A Voice in the Desert") is a recitation, with a soprano soloist and orchestra, written by the English composer Edward Elgar in 1915 as his Op. 77. The French words are by the Belgian poet Émile Cammaerts.

It was first produced, in London at the Shaftesbury Theatre, on 29 January 1916, with the recitation by the Belgian dramatic performer Carlo Liten, the soprano Olga Lynn, and an orchestra conducted by the composer.

The words were translated into English by Cammaerts' wife, Tita Brand.

The work was published as a piano reduction (the vocal parts with piano accompaniment) by Elkin & Co. in 1916.

Synopsis
The reality was horrific. In August 1914 Belgium had been invaded by the German army: the big cities had been destroyed, the carnage on both sides was incalculable and King Albert and his army were driven to the banks of the river Yser in West Flanders.

The Pall Mall Gazette in review of Une voix dans le désert described the scene on stage:

Lyrics

Recordings
Rarely Heard Elgar & Forgotten War Music, Munich Symphony Orchestra, Douglas Bostock conducting, on ClassicO label.
Elgar: War Music Richard Pascoe (narrator), Teresa Cahill (soprano), Barry Collett (conductor), Rutland Sinfonia
 The CD with the book Oh, My Horses! Elgar and the Great War has many historical recordings including Une voix dans le désert with Quand nos bourgeons se rouvriront, a 1985 recording with Alvar Lidell (narrator), Valerie Hill (soprano) and the Kensington Symphony Orchestra conducted by Leslie Head
 Elgar – Bax – For the Fallen, 2016 (CD HLL7544) recording live 7 April 2016 orchestra and choir The Hallé, cond. Mark Elder, recording including "The Spirit of England", Op. 80 (The Hallé, Elder Mark, soprano Rachel Nicholls), "Grania and Diarmid", Op. 42 (mezzo-soprano Shaw Madeleine) and Arnold Bax In Memoriam (only for orchestra) always 2016

Notes

References
Kennedy, Michael, Portrait of Elgar (Oxford University Press, 1968) 
Moore, Jerrold N. "Edward Elgar: A Creative Life" (Oxford University Press, 1984)

External links

Compositions by Edward Elgar
1915 compositions
Compositions with a narrator